Gilia capitata is a species of flowering plant in the phlox family known by the common names blue-thimble-flower, bluehead gilia, blue field gilia, and globe gilia.

Distribution
It is native to much of western North America from Alaska to northern Mexico, and it can be found on the eastern side of the continent as an introduced species. It grows in many habitats, especially in sandy or rocky soils.

Description
Gilia capitata is an annual herb that is somewhat variable in appearance, with branching, leafy stems reaching anywhere from 10 to 90 centimeters in maximum height and sometimes having glandular hairs on the fleshy herbage. The leaves are divided into toothed or lobed leaflets. Atop the branches of the thick stem are spherical inflorescences of 50 to 100 small flowers. Each flower has a throat opening into a spreading corolla which may be white, pink, lavender, or light blue. The stamens protrude slightly from the flower's mouth and are white with white, blue, or pink anthers. The plant attracts native bees and butterflies.

Subspecies
There are several subspecies, including:
G. c. ssp. abrotanifolia - native to California and Baja California
G. c. ssp. capitata - occurs throughout the range of the species
G. c. ssp. chamissonis (dune gilia) - endemic to the sand dunes of California's central coast; bears bright blue-violet flowers
G. c. ssp. mediomontana - native to the Sierra Nevada
G. c. ssp. pacifica - grows along the coastline of Oregon and California
G. c. ssp. pedemontana - native to the Sierra Nevada foothills
G. c. ssp. staminea - found in California and Arizona
G. c. ssp. tomentosa - a rare subspecies known from a few occurrences just north of the San Francisco Bay Area

References

External links
Jepson Manual Treatment - Gilia capitata
Gilia capitata - Photo gallery

capitata
Flora of the Western United States
Flora of Western Canada
Flora of Alaska
Flora of California
Flora of the Cascade Range
Flora of the Sierra Nevada (United States)
Natural history of the California chaparral and woodlands
Flora without expected TNC conservation status